Murtaja may refer to:

 , a steam-powered icebreaker built in 1890 that was the first Finnish state-owned icebreaker
 , a diesel-electric icebreaker built in 1959 and broken up in 1986
 Murtaja Baseer (born 1932), Bangladeshi painter
 Yaser Murtaja (1987/1988–2018), Palestinian video journalist and photographer from the Gaza Strip